| tries = {{#expr:
 + 9 + 10 + 6 + 11 + 9 + 5 + 3 + 6
 + 5 + 4 + 11 + 9 + 6 + 5 + 6 + 4
 + 3 + 7 + 9 + 7 + 10 + 7 + 5 + 9
 + 7 + 5 + 2 + 8 + 3 + 4 + 7 + 4
 + 7 + 8 + 12 + 8 + 8 + 4 + 10 + 9
 + 1 + 11 + 3 + 1 + 2 + 7 + 6 + 12 
 + 9 + 10 + 8 + 5 + 9 + 4 + 8 + 8 
 + 10 + 8 + 7 + 7 + 4 + 9 + 3 + 6
 + 4 + 6 + 6 + 7 + 6 + 2 + 4 + 10
 + 10 + 11 + 6 + 8 + 4 + 6 + 8 + 6 
 + 6 + 2 + 4 + 11 + 2 + 6 + 5 + 10
 + 10 + 1 + 4 + 7 + 10 + 10 + 7 + 7
 + 5 + 2 + 1 + 10 + 3 + 12 + 1 + 11
 + 6 + 2 + 3 + 7 + 6 + 3 + 4 + 3
 + 5 + 2 + 2 + 2 + 2 + 5 + 5 + 5
 + 9 + 5 + 6 + 8 + 3 + 4 + 6 + 4
 + 6 + 10 + 9 + 10 + 15 + 10 + 10 + 6
 + 4 + 7 + 13 + 6 + 6 + 9 + 6 + 7
 + 8 + 2 + 9 + 5 + 10 + 6 + 7 + 4
 + 3 + 4 + 4 + 6 + 6 + 8 + 5 + 6
 + 7 + 7 + 14 + 4  
 + 4 + 7 + 4 + 7 + 13 + 11 + 8 + 6
 + 1 + 9 + 7 + 10 + 7 + 10 + 5 + 9
 + 10 + 10 + 10 + 8  
 + 9 + 8 + 9 + 2 + 7 + 5 + 10 + 6
 + 5 + 6 + 3 + 7 + 8 + 4 + 8 + 10
 + 11 + 5 + 5 + 8 + 6 + 6 + 7 
 + 5 + 5 + 6 + 6 + 11 + 8 + 8 + 12
 + 10 + 7 + 5 + 10 + 5 + 8 + 10 + 8  
 + 11 + 7 + 5 + 7 + 6 + 8 + 9 + 6 
 + 4 + 8 + 4 + 8 + 12 + 7 + 11 + 5
}}
| top point scorer =  Tom White(Old Elthamians)270 points
| top try scorer   =  Craig Holland(Chinnor)25 tries
| prevseason       = 2017–18
| nextseason       = 2019–20
}}

The 2018–19 National League 1, known for sponsorship reasons as the SSE National League 1, is the tenth season of the third tier of the English rugby union system, since the professionalised format of the second tier RFU Championship was introduced; and is the 32nd season since league rugby began in 1987.

The league was one of the most competitive for years, with promotion and relegation not decided until the last round.  In terms of the championship, at one point it looked like four teams could go on to win it, but in the end it was a two horse race between Ampthill and Old Elthamians.  The real decider was when Ampthill won 36-6 at home over Old Elthamians on 3 March 2019, but they still had to keep their head for the remaining five games as Old Elthamians pushed them all the way, eventually claiming the title on 27 April 2019 when they won 52-20 away to Loughborough Students.  Ampthill would be promoted to the 2019–20 RFU Championship - the highest level the club had reached - where they could enjoy derby games at Bedford Blues.

The relegation battle was also hotly contested, with all three sides going down on the last day of the season.  Loughborough Students had barely escaped relegation the previous year but after a poor first half of the season, they started to rally and gain some victories, helped by their try bonus record which was one of the best in the league, and looked at one point that they might do it yet again.  However, defeats in their last two games against Plymouth Albion and champions, Ampthill, condemned them to the drop as the bottom ranked side in the division.  They were joined by Esher (15th), who went down despite a valiant win away to Blackheath, and Caldy (14th), who were relegated after losing to Birmingham Moseley, finishing just 2 points shy of 13th place Cambridge, who had an excellent away win to Sale FC to thank for keeping them up.  Loughborough and Caldy would drop to the 2019–20 National League 2 North while Esher would fall to the 2019–20 National League 2 South.  For Esher demotion to level 4 will make it the lowest level they have played at since the 1999-00 season.

Structure
The league consists of sixteen teams with all the teams playing each other on a home and away basis to make a total of thirty matches each. There is one promotion place with the champions promoted to the Greene King IPA Championship. There are usually three relegation places with the bottom three teams relegated to either National League 2 North or National League 2 South depending on the geographical location of the team.

The results of the matches contribute points to the league as follows:
 4 points are awarded for a win
 2 points are awarded for a draw
 0 points are awarded for a loss, however
 1 losing (bonus) point is awarded to a team that loses a match by 7 points or fewer
 1 additional (bonus) point is awarded to a team scoring 4 tries or more in a match.

Participating teams and locations
Twelve of the sixteen teams participated in the preceding season's competition. The 2017–18 champions, Coventry, were promoted to the 2018–19 RFU Championship, swapping places with bottom club, Rotherham Titans, who were relegated from the 2017–18 RFU Championship.  Sides relegated from the 2017–18 National League 1 included Fylde and Hull Ionians (both National League 2 North) and Old Albanian (National League 2 South).

Teams promoted into the division include Cinderford and Sale FC, champions of 2017–18 National League 2 South and 2017–18 National League 2 North respectively, along with south runners up Chinnor who defeated the north's Sedgley Park in the promotion play-off.  Cinderford are returning to National League 1 after an absence of two seasons, while Sale FC and Chinnor are both playing at the highest league level in their history.

League table

Fixtures & Results

Round 1

Round 2

Round 3

Round 4

Round 5

Round 6

Round 7

Round 8

Round 9

Round 10

Round 11

Round 12

Round 13

Round 14

Round 15

Round 16

Round 17

Round 18

Round 19

Round 20

Round 21

Postponed due to poor weather (snow).  Game to be rescheduled for 23 February 2019.

Postponed due to poor weather (snow).  Game to be rescheduled for 23 February 2019.

Postponed due to poor weather (snow).  Game to be rescheduled for 23 February 2019.

Postponed due to poor weather (snow).  Game to be rescheduled for 23 February 2019.

Round 22

Round 23

Round 21 (rescheduled games)

Game rescheduled from 2 February 2019.

Game rescheduled from 2 February 2019

Game rescheduled from 2 February 2019.

Game rescheduled from 2 February 2019.

Round 24

Round 25

Round 26

Round 27

Round 28

Round 29

Round 30

Caldy are relegated.

Esher are relegated.

Ampthill are champions.  Loughborough Students are relegated.

Attendances

Individual statistics
 Note that points scorers includes tries as well as conversions, penalties and drop goals. Appearance figures also include coming on as substitutes (unused substitutes not included).

Top points scorers

Top try scorers

Season records

Team
Largest home win — 52 points
59 – 7 Ampthill at home to Caldy on 23 February 2019
Largest away win — 40 points
69 – 29 Old Elthamians away to Loughborough Students on 2 February 2019
Most points scored — 69 points
69 – 29 Old Elthamians away to Loughborough Students on 2 February 2019
Most tries in a match — 10
Old Elthamians away to Loughborough Students on 2 February 2019
Most conversions in a match — 8
Old Elthamians away to Loughborough Students on 2 February 2019
Most penalties in a match — 8
Rotherham Titans at home to Rosslyn Park on 15 September 2018
Most drop goals in a match — 1 (5)
Esher away to Bishop's Stortford on 13 October 2018
Sale FC at home to Rosslyn Park on 20 October 2018
Birmingham Moseley at home to Cambridge on 15 December 2018
Darlington Mowden Park at home to Cinderford on 15 December 2018
Sale FC away to Esher on 30 March 2019

Attendances
Highest — 3,556
Plymouth Albion at home to Birmingham Moseley on 30 March 2019
Lowest — 133
Old Elthamians at home to Caldy on 1 December 2018
Highest average attendance — 1,116
Plymouth Albion
Lowest average attendance — 294
Cinderford

Player
Most points in a match — 26
 James Williams for Birmingham Moseley at home to Sale FC on 27 October 2018
Most tries in a match — 4
 Adam Caves for Birmingham Moseley at home to Rotherham Titans on 22 September 2018
Most conversions in a match — 8
 Tom White for Old Elthamians away to Loughborough Students on 2 February 2019
Most penalties in a match — 8
 Alex Dolly for Rotherham Titans at home to Rosslyn Park on 15 September 2018
Most drop goals in a match — 1 (5)
 Owen Waters for Esher away to Bishop's Stortford on 13 October 2018
 Chris Johnson for Sale FC at home to Rosslyn Park on 20 October 2018
 Sam Hollingsworth for Birmingham Moseley at home to Cambridge on 15 December 2018
 Warren Seals for Darlington Mowden Park at home to Cinderford on 15 December 2018
 Emiliano Calle Rivas for Sale FC away to Esher on 30 March 2019

Notes

See also
 English rugby union system
 Rugby union in England

References

External links
 NCA Rugby

3
National League 1 seasons